is a Japanese footballer currently playing as a forward for Sint-Truidense.

Career
On 7 August 2021, Hayashi joined Belgian club Sint-Truidense.

Career statistics

Club
.

Notes

References

External links

1997 births
Living people
Association football forwards
Association football people from Osaka Prefecture
Japanese footballers
Japanese expatriate footballers
Japan youth international footballers
Universiade medalists in football
Universiade gold medalists for Japan
Medalists at the 2019 Summer Universiade
Footballers at the 2020 Summer Olympics
Olympic footballers of Japan
J1 League players
Gamba Osaka players
Sagan Tosu players
Sint-Truidense V.V. players
Japanese expatriate sportspeople in Belgium
Expatriate footballers in Belgium